Jean-Louis René Olry (born 6 August 1946 in Montrouge) is a French retired slalom canoeist who competed from the mid-1960s to the early 1970s. He won a bronze medal in the C-2 event at the 1972 Summer Olympics in Munich.

Olry also won three medals at the ICF Canoe Slalom World Championships with one gold (C-2: 1969) and two bronzes (K-1 team: 1967, C-2 team: 1969).

He partner in the C-2 boat was his brother Jean-Claude.

References

1946 births
Canoeists at the 1972 Summer Olympics
French male canoeists
Living people
Olympic canoeists of France
Olympic bronze medalists for France
Olympic medalists in canoeing
Medalists at the 1972 Summer Olympics
Medalists at the ICF Canoe Slalom World Championships